Taint Pluribus Taint Unum is the debut studio album by the Minneapolis-based noise rock band Cows, released in 1987 through Treehouse Records.

Music
The first track of the album, "Koyaanisqatsi," is a cover of the intro piece from the 1982 film of the same name.

Release and reception
The record was released for a limited time on vinyl and has since gone out of print. Unlike its successors, no songs from Taint Pluribus Taint Unum appeared on the Old Gold 1989–1991 compilation.

AllMusic staff writer John Dougan gave the album four and a half out of five stars, calling it "the Cows at their most impenetrable and noisy" and that "fans of Japanese noise acts like The Boredoms and some of John Zorn's more extreme jazzcore outfits might think this is pretty cool."

Alternative Rock wrote: "Tragically badly recorded though it is, the screaming, grinding, honking mess which occasionally pulls itself into something like music sounds great at 3 in the morning."

Track listing

Personnel
Adapted from the Taint Pluribus Taint Unum liner notes.

Cows
Thor Eisentrager – guitar
Sandris Rutmanis – drums
Kevin Rutmanis – bass guitar
Shannon Selberg – vocals, bugle

Production and additional personnel
 Steve Björklund – assistant engineering, assistant production
 Cows – assistant production
 John Largaespada – cover art
 Brian Paulson – production, engineering

Release history

References

External links 
 

1987 debut albums
Cows (band) albums